Kerketta is a surname. Notable people with the surname include:

Lucas Kerketta (born 1936), Indian clergyman and auxiliary bishop
Robert Kerketta (1932–2018), Indian Roman Catholic bishop
Rose Kerketta (born 1940), Indian writer, poet, thinker, and tribal rights activist
Sushila Kerketta (1939–2009), Indian politician